One Man, One Wife is a 1959 satire novel by Nigerian writer T. M. Aluko. It depicts the contradiction of Yoruba culture and the Christian missionaries. It was published as part of the influential African Writers Series.

References 

1959 Nigerian novels
African Writers Series